1984–85 was the seventy-second occasion on which the Lancashire Cup completion had been held.
 
St. Helens won the trophy  by beating Wigan by the score of 26–18.

The match was played at Central Park, Wigan, (historically in the county of Lancashire). The attendance was 26,074 and receipts were £6,2139.00

This was the first time in over twenty years that the attendance exceeded 20,000, and it would continue around this level for the next four seasons. The receipts climbed from last year's near-record £13,160.00 to £62,139.

Background 

This season the total number of entrants remained at the 16 level.

With this, full sixteen members there was no need for “blank” or “dummy” fixtures or any byes.

Competition and results

Round 1 
Involved  8 matches (with no byes) and 16 clubs

Round 2 - Quarter-finals 
Involved 4 matches and 8 clubs

Round 3 – Semi-finals  
Involved 2 matches and 4 clubs

Final

Teams and scorers 

Scoring - Try = four points - Goal = two points - Drop goal = one point

The road to success

Notes and comments 
1 * Fulham did not have a home ground for this season and were very nomadic. This match played at Station Road
2 * Wigan won the coin toss for the home advantage after neither they nor St. Helens wanted to play at the chosen venue, Wilderspool, due to the low capacity
3 * Central Park was the home ground of Wigan with a final capacity of 18,000, although the record attendance was  47,747 for Wigan v St Helens 27 March 1959

See also 
1984–85 Rugby Football League season
Rugby league county cups

References

External links
Saints Heritage Society
1896–97 Northern Rugby Football Union season at wigan.rlfans.com 
Hull&Proud Fixtures & Results 1896/1897
Widnes Vikings - One team, one passion Season In Review - 1896-97
The Northern Union at warringtonwolves.org

1984 in English rugby league
RFL Lancashire Cup